Antonio Elia Bastianoni, known as Elia Bastianoni (born 18 May 1991) is an Italian footballer who plays as a goalkeeper for Santarcangelo.

Club career
He made his Serie C debut for Carpi on 4 September 2011 in a game against Tritium.

On 12 July 2016, he joined Bassano on a free transfer after being released by Catania in the summer.

References

External links
 

1991 births
Sportspeople from the Province of Genoa
Living people
Italian footballers
A.C. Carpi players
S.S.D. Varese Calcio players
U.S. Livorno 1915 players
Catania S.S.D. players
Bassano Virtus 55 S.T. players
Santarcangelo Calcio players
Serie B players
Serie C players
Serie D players
Association football goalkeepers
People from Santa Margherita Ligure
Footballers from Liguria